Anne Elizabeth Power  is an emerita professor of social policy and Head of Housing and Communities at the London School of Economics. She is a founder of the National Communities Resource Centre. Power is the author of several books and has had writings published in the Guardian.

Career 
From 1979 to 1989 Power worked for the Department of the Environment and Welsh Office, helping set up the Priority Estates Projects to rescue run-down estates countrywide.

In 1991 Power became founding director of the National Communities Resource Centre, which she founded with Brian Abel-Smith and Richard Rogers. 

Power was awarded a CBE in June 2000, for services to regeneration and the promotion of resident participation. Between the years 2000 to 2009 Power was a Commissioner on the Sustainable Development Commission.

List of books
Hovels  to  High  Rise  (1993)
Swimming  against  the  tide (1995) - co-authored with Rebecca Tunstall
Dangerous  Disorder (1997) - co-authored with Rebecca Tunstall
The  Slow  Death  of  Great  Cities? Urban  abandonment or urban renaissance (1999)-  with  Katharine  Mumford
Estates on the Edge (1999) 
Cities for a Small Country (2000) - written with Richard Rodgers
Boom  or  Abandonment  (2003) - with Katharine Mumford
East Enders: Family and community in East London (2003) with Katharine Mumford
City survivors, Bringing up children in disadvantaged neighbourhoods (2007)
Jigsaw cities: Big places, small spaces (2007) - co-authored by John Houghton
Phoenix cities, The fall and rise of great industrial cities (2010) - with Jörg Plöger and Astrid Winkler
Family futures, Childhood and poverty in urban neighbourhoods (2011) - with Helen Willmot and Rosemary Davidson
Cities for a Small Continent, International Handbook of City Recovery (2016)

References

Living people

Year of birth missing (living people)
British women academics
21st-century British women writers